The name Nestor has been used for two tropical cyclones worldwide.

In the Atlantic Ocean:
 Tropical Storm Nestor (2019), a short lived tropical storm that affected the Southeastern United States. 

In the Western Pacific Ocean:
 Typhoon Nestor (1997) (T9706, 07W), a Category 5 super typhoon that affected the Northern Mariana Islands.

Atlantic hurricane set index articles
Pacific typhoon set index articles